Ok-nyeo  (옥녀) is a 1928 Korean film. The silent, black-and-white production was written, directed, and edited by Na Woon-gyu. It was the second film to be produced by Na Woon-gyu Productions, which was financed by Park Seung-pil, owner of the Danseongsa Theater in Seoul. It premiered at Park's Theater in January 1928.

Plot
The two brothers form a love triangle fighting over a woman called oknyeo,and the elder brother is sacrificed through the fighting while covering up for his younger brother's sins for the happiness of his younger brother.

Themes
The film was heavily influenced by the enlightment movement at the time.

Reception
After watching the test screening of the film, The Dong-a Ilbo at the time commented that although it is understandable that  horrific things can happen if the emotions of love and lust goes to the extreme, yet could not find anything in Oknyeo's attitude that would lead to such a fight and it would be an exaggeration for such an incident to happen in Korea but it acknowledged the commercial values in that it somehow made the story beautiful.

See also
List of Korean-language films
Cinema of Korea

References

External links 
 

1928 films
Pre-1948 Korean films
Korean silent films
Korean black-and-white films
Films directed by Na Woon-gyu